The Eddy Arnold Show is the name of three similar American network television summer variety programs during the 1950s hosted by Eddy Arnold and featuring popular music stars of the day. It was also the name of a radio program starring Arnold.

CBS and NBC
The Eddy Arnold Show debuted on CBS-TV on July 14, 1952 from New York City, as a live 15-minute summer replacement for The Perry Como Show on Monday, Wednesday, and Friday nights from 7:45–8 pm ET. Arnold's guitarists Hank Garland and Roy Wiggins (steel guitar) appeared. The program's final broadcast was August 22, 1952.

From July 7 to October 1, 1953, NBC-TV carried The Eddy Arnold Show as a live 15-minute summer replacement for The Dinah Shore Show. The program aired on Tuesday and Thursday nights from 7:30–7:45 pm ET, and featured Russ Case and the NBC Orchestra, as well as Garland and Wiggins. Guests included the Davis Sisters and the Dickens Sisters—Helen, Mary and Patti. The show was directed by Ben Park.

ABC
The Eddy Arnold Show had its longest run on ABC-TV from April 26 to September 26, 1956, as a half-hour series. The live program aired from 8–8:30 pm ET on Thursdays as a summer replacement for Life is Worth Living, then on June 20 moved to 9:30–10 pm on Wednesdays.

This show featured a regular cast of Chet Atkins, Garland, Wiggins, and the instrumental Paul Mitchell (piano) Quartet. The Springfield News & Leader observed, "The show is plain and warm, utilizing virtually no sets but building its numbers around lighting effects."

The program originated from the Jewell Theatre (before an audience of about 500) in Springfield, Missouri, which was equipped for live television production as the home of ABC's Ozark Jubilee. Its original producer and writer was Charlie Brown, who left in August 1956 after he had won the Democratic primary election on his way to becoming a US representative. Jubilee producer-director Bryan Bisney took over, with the Jubilee's Don Richardson becoming writer. Guest stars included:

References

Further reading

External links 
 

1952 American television series debuts
1953 American television series debuts
1956 American television series debuts
1952 American television series endings
1953 American television series endings
1956 American television series endings
1950s American variety television series
American Broadcasting Company original programming
Black-and-white American television shows
CBS original programming
English-language television shows
NBC original programming